Davor can refer to:

 Davor, Croatia, a village in Croatia
 Davor (name), a Slavic given name